The 4th Local Elections were held in South Korea on 31 May 2006. It was the first local elections in South Korea to have political parties nominating candidates for Municipal Councillors. The ruling Uri Party proved its declining popularity since the 2004 general elections while the main opposition party, Grand National Party managed to clinch back lost grounds, using the opportunity for the presidential election the following year.

Metropolitan city mayoral elections

Seoul

Incheon

Daejeon

Gwangju

Daegu

Busan

Ulsan

Gubernatorial elections

Gyeonggi

Gangwon

North Chungcheong

South Chungcheong

North Jeolla

South Jeolla

North Gyeongsang

South Gyeongsang

Jeju

Provincial-level council elections

Summary

Constituency seats

Proportional representation seats

Municipal-level mayoral elections

Summary

By region

Municipal-level council elections

Summary

Constituency seats

Proportional representation seats

References 

2006 elections in South Korea
2006